Banks v. Manchester, 128 U.S. 244 (1888), was a United States Supreme Court ruling dealing with copyright. In 1882, to facilitate the printing of records of the Supreme Court of Ohio, the state of Ohio passed a resolution to establish a copyright held by the Supreme Court of Ohio's court reporter and advertised a contract for printing copies of the records for Ohio by the lowest bidder in exchange for obtaining exclusive publishing rights for two years. H. W. Derby & Company won the bidding war and assigned all their right and interest in the contract to Banks & Brothers. Banks then contracted the Capital Printing and Publishing Company to print the books.

Banks proceeded to print various reports, among which included Bierce et al. v. Bierce et al. and The Scioto Valley Railway Company v. McCoy. Although, for a time, exclusive to Banks's publications, G. L. Manchester published these cases in the American Law Journal, a periodical. Banks sought to stop Manchester from printing the cases. Manchester refused because judges had authored the decisions; therefore, he claimed that Banks did not have a copyright. Banks's position was that the state's copyright, held by the court reporter E. L. De Witt and licensed to them, afforded them the exclusivity.

The Court ruled that the State could not hold a copyright and affirmed its decision in Wheaton v. Peters by stating "what a court or a judge thereof cannot confer on a reporter as the basis of a copyright in him, they cannot confer on any other person or on the state."

References

External links
 

1888 in United States case law
United States copyright case law
United States Supreme Court cases
United States Supreme Court cases of the Fuller Court